The Scenic Railway is a wooden roller coaster located at the Dreamland Amusement Park in Margate, United Kingdom. It first opened in 1920 and is the oldest roller coaster in the UK. The ride is distinctive compared to modern-day roller coasters, as a brakeman is still required to travel with the train to control its speed, manually applying brakes when needed. It is also one of only eight scenic railways in the world, and the UK's English Heritage granted the roller coaster Grade II listed status in 2002 and Grade II* listed status in 2011. The Scenic Railway was non-operational from 2006 until 2015 amid park closure and restoration following an arson attack.

History

In 1919, John Henry Iles bought the European usage rights to the scenic railway from LaMarcus Adna Thompson, who had patented the scenic railway design in 1884. Iles was a co-owner of Dreamland and had the Scenic Railway constructed at Dreamland from local timber and had mechanical parts for the ride shipped over from the US. The ride drew on ideas from several other designers, but was constructed by local carpenters within the area specified by Iles.

Fire destroyed part of the ride in 1949 and the structure required major repairs. Replacement timber for the ride was bought from the dismantled pier at Lowestoft and the ride re-opened in 1950. Fire again destroyed parts of the ride in 1957.

Some of the Margate trains were sold to Battersea Fun Fair in the 1960s where they were used on the Scenic Railway there (called the 'Big Dipper' at that site). It was one of the ex-Margate trains that was involved in the Battersea Big Dipper disaster of 1972 when 5 children were killed and several injured. It was during the aftermath of this accident that most of the wooden roller coasters in Britain's amusement parks were removed as, irrespective of the actual standards of safety on the rides, public confidence had been dented.

The Scenic Railway was successfully granted Grade II listed status in 2002, making it the first roller coaster ever to be given any form of protection against demolition. It continued operating until 2006 after Dreamland closed to the public in 2003. On 7 April 2008, it was targeted in an arson attack, and a significant portion of the ride was damaged. In 2011 the ride's listing status was upgraded from Grade II to Grade II* despite the fire damage due to the rarity of the ride and its international significance as one of the world's oldest roller coasters. It reopened in 2015 after going through an extensive repair process.

Restoration 
Dreamland restored the Scenic Railway as part of a broader initiative to rejuvenate the amusement park. On 16 November 2009, the Dreamland Trust was awarded a grant by UK's Department for Culture, Media and Sport to restore the Scenic Railway and other historic areas of the park.  Topbond Plc of Kent were contracted to rebuild the woodwork, while WGH Engineering from Doncaster restored the ride's mechanical operation. During restoration, the wooden structure that was in the midst of being rebuilt was knocked down by high winds in December 2014, which set back the timeline to reopen the attraction. The roller coaster reopened to the public on 15 October 2015.

Ride description
The ride consists of a wooden-tracked railway with steel rails supported by a wooden structure. The track is in a trough, and as such is often incorrectly referred to as a side-friction coaster. The train actually makes no contact with the trough walls; they are present simply to provide some lateral protection from derailment as the running wheels are flanged like those of railway vehicles. The layout of the track consists of a double-loop with two cable lift-hill sections. The drops off both of the lift hills are double-drops.

The original trains were destroyed by the fire in 2008, so new trains were constructed for the restored ride in 2015. The trains of the ride consist of three cars mounted on bogies. The bodies and much of the chassis of the cars are wooden, and 28 riders can travel on each train. The brakeman rides between the first and second cars on the bogie and operates the brakes with a large lever.

References 

Roller coasters in the United Kingdom
Tourist attractions in Kent
Grade II* listed buildings in Kent
Roller coasters introduced in 1920
Roller coasters with brakemen